The Shuttle-C was a study by NASA to turn the Space Shuttle launch stack into a dedicated uncrewed cargo launcher. The Space Shuttle external tank and Space Shuttle Solid Rocket Boosters (SRBs) would be combined with a cargo module to take the place of the Shuttle orbiter and include the main engines. Various Shuttle-C concepts were investigated between 1984 and 1995.

The Shuttle-C concept would theoretically cut development costs for a heavy launch vehicle by re-using technology developed for the shuttle program. End-of-life and Space Shuttle hardware would also have been used. One proposal even involved converting Columbia or Enterprise into a single-use cargo launcher. Before the loss of Space Shuttle Challenger, NASA had expected about 24 shuttle flights a year. In the aftermath of the Challenger incident, it became clear that this launch rate was not feasible for a variety of reasons. With the Shuttle-C, it was thought that the lower maintenance and safety requirements for the uncrewed vehicle would allow a higher flight rate.

The Shuttle-C would have been the main crew launch vehicle for the Piloted ILREC Lander in the International Lunar Resources Exploration Program.

In the early 1990s, NASA engineers planning a crewed mission to Mars included a Shuttle-C design to launch six non-reusable, 80-ton segments to create two Mars ships in Earth orbit. After President George W. Bush called for the end of the Space Shuttle by 2010, these proposed configurations were put aside.

See also
 Shuttle SERV
 Magnum (rocket)
 Shuttle-derived vehicle
 Shuttle-Derived Heavy Lift Launch Vehicle, a heavy lift launch vehicle with a similar design.
Energia
 List of space launch system designs

References

External links
 Encyclopedia Astronautica link on the Shuttle-C

Space Shuttle program
Partially reusable space launch vehicles
Shuttle-derived space launch vehicles
Cancelled space launch vehicles